Rhenium diselenide is an inorganic compound with the formula ReSe2. It has a layered structure where atoms are strongly bonded within each layer. The layers are held together by weak Van der Waals bonds, and can be easily peeled off from the bulk material.

Synthesis

Rhenium diselenide with a thickness as small as a triple-atomic layer can be produced by chemical vapor deposition at ambient pressure. A mixture of Ar and hydrogen gases is flown through a tube whose ends are kept at different temperatures. The substrate and ReO3 powder are placed at the hot end which is heated to 750 °C, and selenium powder is located at the cold end which is kept at 250 °C.

2 ReO3 + 7 Se → 2 ReSe2 + 3 SeO2

Properties

As most other dichalcogenides of transition metals, rhenium diselenide has a layered structure where atoms are strongly bonded within each layer and the layers are held together by weak Van der Waals bonds. However, while most other layered dichalcogenides have a high (hexagonal) symmetry, ReSe2 has a very low triclinic symmetry, and this symmetry does not change from the bulk to monolayers.

References

Rhenium compounds
Selenides
Transition metal dichalcogenides
Monolayers